A statue of Philip Schuyler (sometimes called Major General Philip Schuyler) by J. Massey Rhind is installed outside Albany City Hall in Albany, New York, United States. The memorial is slated for removal, as of June 2020.

Description
The bronze sculpture of Philip Schuyler is approximately 114 in. tall and has a diameter of 65 in. Schuyler wears a military uniform, including a cape and hat, and has his arms folded in front. The statue rests on a marble base which is approximately 87 in. tall and has a diameter of 115 in. An inscription on a plaque reads: "PRESENTED IN LOVING MEMORY OF / HIS WIFE THEODORA M. HAWLEY TO THE / CITY OF ALBANY, BY GEORGE C. HAWLEY / MCMXXV / CITIZENS' COMMITTEE / HON. WM. S. HACKETT, MAYOR FRANK B. GRAVES / HON. WM. E. WOOLLARD DR. ARTHUR W. ELTING."

History
Dedicated on June 14, 1925, the monument was donated by George C. Hawley to commemorate his wife Theodora M. Hawley.

The artwork was surveyed by the Smithsonian Institution's "Save Outdoor Sculpture!" program in 1992.

In June 2020 Mayor Kathy Sheehan said that it needed to be taken down because at the time he lived in Albany, he was the biggest slave owner in the city.  “The removal of the Philip Schuyler statue does not reform systems or eliminate the racism institutionalized in these systems locally and nationally,” Chief City Auditor Dorcey Applyrs said in the Thursday statement. “However, it symbolically demonstrates an acknowledgement that slavery was wrong. The removal of this statue also acknowledges the horrific and negative implications of slavery and its impact on the lives of Black Americans in the City of Albany every day."

See also

 List of monuments and memorials removed during the George Floyd protests

References

External links
 

1925 establishments in New York (state)
1925 sculptures
Bronze sculptures in New York (state)
Buildings and structures in Albany, New York
Removed statues
Marble sculptures in New York (state)
Monuments and memorials in New York (state)
Monuments and memorials removed during the George Floyd protests
Outdoor sculptures in New York (state)
Sculptures of men in New York (state)
Statues in New York (state)
Relocated buildings and structures in New York (state)
Sculptures by J. Massey Rhind